Sir Denis James "Jim" Killen,  (23 November 1925 – 12 January 2007) was an Australian politician and a Liberal Party member of the Australian House of Representatives from December 1955 to August 1983, representing the Division of Moreton in Queensland. He served as Vice-President of the Executive Council, Minister for Defence and Minister for the Navy during his parliamentary career.

Education and early career
Killen was born in Dalby, Queensland and educated at Brisbane Grammar School and the University of Queensland, where he graduated in law. He enlisted for service in the Royal Australian Air Force during World War II; he was discharged in 1945 with the rank of flight sergeant. After the war he worked on the land before returning to Brisbane. In 1949 he joined the new Liberal Party of Australia and became the founding president of the Queensland Young Liberals.

Political career

In the 1955 election, Killen was elected to the House of Representatives for the Brisbane seat of Moreton, holding the seat until 1983. He quickly became known as a talented orator but his outspokenness and commitment to causes that Menzies regarded as contrary to Liberal Party principles limited his chances of promotion.

His critics alleged he was associated with the extremist Australian League of Rights, whose director, Eric Dudley Butler, was a notorious anti-Semite, although Killen himself was never accused of anti-Semitism. He was a supporter of Ian Smith's regime in Rhodesia and opposed sanctions against apartheid South Africa.

In the 1961 election, Killen narrowly retained his seat, and since Robert Menzies' Liberal government was re-elected with a majority of only two, and with Killen's seat the last to be declared, it was claimed by some that Killen had 'saved' Menzies and his government. Killen claimed that Menzies had phoned him, saying "Killen, you are magnificent!", and that story was widely repeated for many years, but he later confessed he had made it up for the Courier-Mail to overcome his disappointment at not, in fact, receiving such a call from Menzies.

By the late 1960s Killen had somewhat moderated his views, and in the government of John Gorton he served as Minister for the Navy from 1969 to 1971. When William McMahon became Prime Minister, Killen was dropped from the Ministry. After the Liberals lost office to Labor under Gough Whitlam, he served in the Shadow Cabinet under Billy Snedden and Malcolm Fraser from 1972 to 1975, acting as the party spokesman on Education and later Defence. He served as Minister for Defence in the Fraser Government from 1975 to 1982.

During this time he oversaw a major review of the Australian Defence Force and also the military build-up which followed the Soviet invasion of Afghanistan in 1979. He oversaw the largest single piece of Defence expenditure in Australian history, the purchase of 75 F/A-18 Hornets.

Killen was moved out of Defence in a 1982 reshuffle. He was made a Knight Commander of the Order of St Michael and St George, becoming "Sir James Killen KCMG", and appointed Vice-President of the Executive Council, a position he held until the defeat of the Fraser government in 1983 election by Labor under Bob Hawke. He became Father of the House of Representatives in April 1983, and resigned his seat of Moreton in August 1983 (the first Queensland Member of the House of Representatives to resign), and returned to his legal practice. He was a prominent figure at the Brisbane bar through the 1980s and 1990s.

Killen was a prominent monarchist and was elected to the Constitutional Convention in 1998 as an opponent of an Australian republic. In 2004, he was made a Companion of the Order of Australia (AC).

Killen had a reputation as a great parliamentary wit who developed close friendships with many people on both sides of politics, among them Gough Whitlam, Fred Daly and Barry Cohen. He wrote the preface to Daly's collection of political anecdotes, The Politician Who Laughed (1982).

Private life
Killen was married twice. His first marriage was in 1949, to Joy (née Buley), with whom he had three daughters (one of whom predeceased him). Joy Killen died in 2000, and he married his second wife, Benise (née Atherton) the following year.

In 1976, Mungo MacCallum published an article in the Nation Review magazine alleging that Killen was having an extramarital affair with Margaret Guilfoyle, one of his cabinet colleagues. Oblique references to the rumours had also been made in other publications. He and Guilfoyle sued for defamation, and obtained an injunction against further publication.

Killen died in Brisbane in 2007. Gough Whitlam delivered the eulogy at his state funeral at Brisbane's St. John's Cathedral. Killen was survived by his second wife Benise, his two surviving daughters, and two granddaughters.

References

 

1925 births
2007 deaths
Australian monarchists
Companions of the Order of Australia
Australian Knights Commander of the Order of St Michael and St George
Australian politicians awarded knighthoods
Delegates to the Australian Constitutional Convention 1998
Liberal Party of Australia members of the Parliament of Australia
Members of the Australian House of Representatives for Moreton
Members of the Australian House of Representatives
Leaders of the Australian House of Representatives
Members of the Cabinet of Australia
Defence ministers of Australia
20th-century Australian politicians
Australian memoirists
20th-century memoirists
Royal Australian Air Force airmen
Royal Australian Air Force personnel of World War II